Evan Mulholland is an Australian politician. He is a member of the Victorian Legislative Council representing the Northern Metropolitan since November 2022. Mulholland is a member of the Liberal Party.

References 

Living people
Members of the Victorian Legislative Council
Liberal Party of Australia members of the Parliament of Victoria
21st-century Australian politicians
Year of birth missing (living people)